The Calypso Monarch (originally Calypso King) contest is one of the two major annual calypso competitions held in Trinidad as part of the annual carnival celebrations.

History
While Trinidad's carnival has its origins in the 18th century, a singing contest was first held in 1911, when the Jubilee Establishment offered a prize for "the most original song on a local topic". Further competitions were held after World War I, and the Calypso King contest was first held in 1939. The first winner was Growling Tiger with "Trade Union", followed by Roaring Lion in 1940 and Mighty Destroyer in 1941. After a break during World War II, it resumed in 1946, with Atilla the Hun winning the first of two consecutive titles. Mighty Spoiler won the first of three titles in 1948, and Lord Melody the first of three the following year. The competition's most successful calypsonians, Mighty Sparrow and Chalkdust, have won the title eight and nine times respectively, the first in 1956, and the last in 1992 for Sparrow, and Chalkdust's reigns were between 1976 and 2017.

While calypso had been traditionally a male preserve, the contest was won in 1978 by Calypso Rose, prompting the organisers to crown her 'Calypso Monarch', the gender-neutral title remaining from that day. There was not another female winner until Singing Sandra took the crown in 1999. Singing Sandra is the only female calypsonian to win the Calypso Monarch twice. She won the crown again in 2003.

The late Mighty Duke is the only calypsonian to have won the title on four consecutive occasions between 1968 and 1971.

Rastafari calypsonian Black Stalin won the title on five occasions between 1979 and 1995.

The contest is limited to Trinidad & Tobago nationals however similar Calypso Monarch contests are now held annually in other Caribbean countries and also in North America and the United Kingdom.

Winners

Multiple Titles
Only a few Calypsonians have the honour of being crowned multiple-time monarchs,

See also
Harry Belafonte, US artist arguably best known for his interpretations of Calypso music

References

Trinidad and Tobago culture
Folk festivals in Trinidad and Tobago
1939 establishments in Trinidad and Tobago